Deutsche Wanderjugend (DWJ) is the youth organization of the Association of German Mountain and Hiking Associations e. V. (Deutscher Wanderverband).  DWJ was founded in 1952 in Bad Berneck,

Currently, 58 member associations in Germany are affiliated with DWJ.  DWJ currently has approximately 100,000 children and young people under age 26 as members.  Members are organized in over 1,000 children and youth groups

Activities 
DWJ activities ranges from weekly group lessons to international encounters that bring together partners from different countries. A special emphasis lies in the area of "youth hiking". Member are active also in climbing, nature conservation, sports, games and dance.

The DWJ is involved in the formation and development of the personality in social, ecological and democratic competence and in growing into social and socio-political responsibility. The main concern of the DWJ is to represent the interests of children and young people in all areas of society, to convey meaningful orientation and to initiate processes of social life and learning.

The DWJ is a member of the German Federal Youth Circle (DBJR), the Association for Child and Youth Services (AGJ), and the Federal Forum for Children and Youth Travel. It is non-denominational and politically independent.

The DWJ magazine WALK & more is published four times a year.

Geocaching  
From 2006 to 2012, DWJ was the operator of the geocaching website Opencaching.de. It continues to operate the geocaching portal Geocaching.de.

External links
  Deutsche Wanderjugend, official site

Youth organisations based in Germany